George Henry Goulding (19 November 1884 – 31 January 1966) was a Canadian athlete who competed mainly in the 10 kilometre walk.

He competed in three events at the 1908 Olympic Games in London: the 3500 metre walking race, in which he came fourth; the 10 mile walk, which he failed to finish; and the Marathon, in which he came 22nd out of 55 starters and 27 finishers. The two walking distances were discontinued after London.

He also competed for Canada in the 1912 Summer Olympics held in Stockholm, Sweden in the inaugural 10 kilometre walk where he won the gold medal.

References

External links

George Goulding at the Canadian Olympic Committee

1884 births
1966 deaths
Sportspeople from Kingston upon Hull
English emigrants to Canada
Canadian male racewalkers
Canadian male marathon runners
Olympic gold medalists for Canada
Athletes (track and field) at the 1908 Summer Olympics
Athletes (track and field) at the 1912 Summer Olympics
Olympic track and field athletes of Canada
Medalists at the 1912 Summer Olympics
Olympic gold medalists in athletics (track and field)
Burials at St. James Cemetery, Toronto